is a Japanese professional shogi player ranked 6-dan.

Early life
Ōhira was born in Kita, Tokyo on May 11, 1977.

Ōhira was promoted to the rank of 1-dan in 1993 and obtained full professional status and the rank of 4-dan in April 2002 after winning the winning the 30th 3-dan League (October 2001March 2002) with a record of 16 wins and 2 losses.

Promotion history
The promotion history for Ōhira is as follows.
 6-kyū: 1990
 1-dan: 1993
 4-dan: April 1, 2002
 5-dan: September 19, 2006
 6-dan: January 8, 2016

References

External links
ShogiHub: Professional Player Info · Ohira, Takehiro

1977 births
Japanese shogi players
Living people
Professional shogi players
Professional shogi players from Tokyo
People from Kita